Kostrov (from костёр meaning bonfire) is a Russian masculine surname, its feminine counterpart is Kostrova. It may refer to
Anna Kostrova (1909–1994), Russian painter, graphic artist and book illustrator
Dmitri Kostrov (born 1981), Russian football player
Ermil Kostrov (ca. 1755–1796), Russian poet and translator
Igor Costrov (born 1987), Moldovan football player
Nikolai Kostrov (1901–1995), Russian painter, graphic artist and illustrator, husband of Anna
Vladimir Kostrov (born 1935), Russian poet

Russian-language surnames